The Taylor-Stokes House is a historic log house in rural southeastern Stone County, Arkansas. It is a saddle-bag log structure, with two log pens on either side of a central chimney. A gable roof covers the pens and extends over porches on either side of the pens. The log structure is sheathed in weatherboard. Built in 1876, it is one of the oldest known log structures in Stone County, and the only one that is a saddle-bag variety.

The house was listed on the National Register of Historic Places in 1985.

See also
National Register of Historic Places listings in Stone County, Arkansas

References

Houses on the National Register of Historic Places in Arkansas
Houses completed in 1876
Houses in Stone County, Arkansas
National Register of Historic Places in Stone County, Arkansas